Don Soffer Aventura High School (DSAHS) is a charter high school in Aventura, Florida.

It was named after land developer Donald Soffer.

History
By the 2010s Aventura area parents wanted a high school in the Aventura city limits, partly because they perceived the Miami Dade County Public Schools-operated Krop High School to have become too large, even though in 2012 Krop had a strong academic reputation. That year city council refused to go forward with the idea. Colleen Wright of the Miami Herald stated that Krop's reputation was overshadowed by other newer schools and the demand for a new Aventura High School continued.

Gulfstream Park Racing and Casino formerly owned the land which the Aventura city government purchased for the high school. DSAHS has plans to have 800 students.

The campus has  of land. Upon opening the school construction was not fully finished.
In 2019, the Don Soffer Aventura High School building was finally finished with the first year of students entering the school in August of that year. With over 100 students in the school that year, the year went by smoothly. When COVID-19 started to occur, everyone was sent to their homes and learning continued from there.

References

External links
 Don Soffer Aventura High School
 Profile at City of Aventura
 
 Aventura Charter High School Watermain Relocation - Construction Journal
 https://patch.com/florida/aventura/directory/listing/53492/don-soffer-aventura-high-school-opens-enrollment-for-2019-2020-school-year

Charter schools in Florida
Public high schools in Miami-Dade County, Florida
2019 establishments in Florida
Educational institutions established in 2019